Buddy Holly was an American musician and singer-songwriter whose career spanned from 1952 to 1959.  This list includes songs that he recorded as a group leader or a solo artist that have been officially released in various formats.  Year indicates when the recording was first released commercially.

See also
Buddy Holly discography

Notes

Holly, Buddy